The SNCF 141 R is a class of 2-8-2 steam locomotives of the   Société Nationale des Chemins de fer Français (French State Railways). They were used all over the French rail network from 1945 to 1974.

History 

At the end of World War II, there was a shortage of locomotives, and to quickly obtain the large number needed locomotives were ordered from the main American and Canadian locomotive builders under the Lend-Lease Program (and not the Marshall Plan, signed in April 1948, as often written).

The design was based on the Green Bay & Western Railroad's successfully customised Mikados, based somewhat on the USRA Light Mikado, suitably modified to meet the SNCF loading gauge. Modifications included the overall height, the fitting of European couplers and buffers, left-hand drive, smoke deflectors (to a unique and instantly recognisable style) and a Kylchap exhaust on the second batch.

The first order for 700 engines was placed in February 1945 with production split between the "big three" American locomotive builders: Baldwin Locomotive Works, Philadelphia, Pennsylvania, American Locomotive Company, Schenectady, New York, and Lima Locomotive Works, Lima, Ohio. Once financing was made available, the second batch of 640 engines was ordered from the "big three", plus the Canadian manufacturers Montreal Locomotive Works, Montreal Quebec and Canadian Locomotive Company, Kingston, Ontario. Most of this batch were built as oil burners, burning preheated heavy fuel oil (known in French as 'Mazout'), unlike the first batch which had all been designed as coal fired.

The massive introduction of oil fired locomotives was due to the fact that in the immediate post-war period, the quality coal was in high demand and SNCF was consuming 9 million tons per annum. Oil thus allowed savings in coal, even if in many depots it required a revolution in working conditions. The extra range permitted by oil— instead of —explains also the more intensive use of the locomotives. The enginemen nicknamed the locomotives mazoutières or charbonnières ("coal-scuttles") according to fuel employed; oil-burners were also called les goudronneuses ("tar spraying machines") by their crews.

After the second world war, the American manufacturers' output had been boosted by the war effort. Thus from July 1945 to May 1946 the 700 141 R of the first batch were built in only eleven months. It is possible to observe significant variations in monthly production. Large scale production started in September, and reached its height during October, November, December and January, to slow down in February and March, and to continue until finished in May, or, an average of almost three engines per day! By way of comparison in French locomotives works (French industry having been weakened by the war) it took four years, from June 1948 to July 1952, for the manufacturer Schneider to deliver 35 241 P to the SNCF.

The first engine, the 141 R 1 built by Lima, left the workshops on 30 July 1945. The 141 R 466 was the first to be unloaded in France on 17 November 1945, at the port of Marseille. The last of the series, the 141 R 1340, left the workshops of Canadian Locomotive Company in July 1947 and on 5 September was unloaded at the port of Cherbourg. Seventeen engines (the 141 R 1220–1235 and 141 R 1241) were lost at sea when the ship transporting them, the Norwegian ship  sank in a violent storm off Newfoundland on 11 April 1947. So of the 1340 engines initially ordered, only 1323 entered in service on the French network.

For the SNCF, this type of machine constituted a small revolution – with simple expansion and very advanced construction techniques, the 141 R 1101–1340 were the only SNCF steam locomotives equipped with Boxpok wheels, and roller bearings on all the driving and coupled axles, as well as an almost indeformable one-piece cast steel frame. The bar frames and the axle box bearings of 141 R 1–1100, appeared irreproachable, which made them powerful machines but economical to maintain. Easy to drive, they offered relatively modern comfort for both drivers and firemen. The cabs were fully enclosed, equipped with a comfort and an ergonomic hitherto unknown to SNCF crews. Driving and firing controls were within reach while seated, with automatic coal feeding thanks to the mechanical stoker, and oil-firing was even easier. They were banalisées ("standardised"), that is, not assigned to a particular crew.

On 19 October 1975 the last 141 R in use with the SNCF, 141 R 1187 of Vénissieux depot, worked a special return working between Lyon and Veynes. Four locomotives of Narbonne depot were leased to the Hellenic State Railways from November 1973 to April 1974.

Preserved locomotives 
Twelve 141.R locomotives have been preserved. Among them, in operating condition are:
 141 R 420, (coal) based in Clermont-Ferrand, managed by the Sté Civile de Conservation de la 141 R 420. 
 141 R 840, (oil) based in Aubrais-Orléans, managed by the "AAATV" : Amicale des Anciens et Amis de la Traction à Vapeur, section Centre/Val de Loire.
 141 R 1126, (oil) owned by the SNCF, based in Toulouse, managed by L'Amicale des Cheminots pour la Préservation de la 141 R 1126 
 141 R 1199, (oil) owned by the SNCF, based in Nantes, managed by Loco Vapeur R 1199

These four locomotives are protected as monument historique (national heritage objects).

Five locos are based in Switzerland with two in working order:
 141 R 568 (coal) ex CITEV. Along with 1244, it has a Long Bell 3-chime whistle but also with the standard short bell 3-chime whistle.
 141 R 1244 (oil). This is one of the SNCF 141r to have a 3-chime whistle and an additional 5-chime whistle instead of the SNCF's standard single-chime whistle. The other one is 568.
Another three are stored there as spare parts after the bankruptcy of the company in charge of their restoration.
 141 R 73 (coal)
 141 R 1207 (coal)
 141 R 1332 (oil)

The three remaining locomotives are all the property of the SNCF and are preserved as static exhibits.
 141 R 1108 (oil) at Breil-sur-Roya
 141 R 1187 (oil) at the Cité du train de Mulhouse
 141 R 1298 (oil) at Miramas

Image gallery

References 
 Translated from the French language Wikipedia, December 2007

External links 
 141 R 1199 website with a  Video of the 141 R 1199 at work
 Video of 141 R 1199 departing from Nevers

2-8-2 locomotives
141.R
ALCO locomotives
Baldwin locomotives
Lima locomotives
MLW locomotives
CLC locomotives
Steam locomotives of France
Railway locomotives introduced in 1945
Standard gauge locomotives of France